Close is the sixth studio album by Kim Wilde, released in mid 1988.

Produced by Ricky Wilde and Tony Swain, Close was the final album on which Marty Wilde had co-writer credits. The album is widely perceived by fans and critics (and Kim herself) as Wilde's most well-balanced, with many kinds of pop represented: dance, ballad, rock and midtempo.

The album's lead single was "Hey Mister Heartache", featuring backing vocals from Junior Giscombe – but its success was dwarfed by the follow-up single, "You Came", which hit the Top 10 in many countries and just missed the US Top 40.

"Never Trust a Stranger" and "Four Letter Word" also reached the UK Top 10, although a fifth single "Love in the Natural Way" was less successful. Attention for the album was bolstered by Kim's support slot on Michael Jackson's European tour.

Close reached the Top 10 in the UK, almost all Scandinavian countries, Austria and Germany and went on to become Wilde's biggest selling album, being certified platinum in the UK. In Australia, the album was less successful, peaking at #82 on the ARIA albums chart.

A 2-CD 25th Anniversary Edition of Close was released in the United Kingdom in September 2013, with the album's original 10 tracks bolstered by an additional 21 B-sides and remixes.

Critical response

Anne Lambert, noting the ups and downs of Wilde's career, concluded that Close was "proof that Kim will still be around when her rivals are fighting it out in the bargain bins." Despite expressing hope that the singer would "experiment and take some chances", the reviewer singled out both the "luscious ballad" "Four Letter Word" and the "brilliant funk" of "Hey Mister Heartache". Smash Hits gave a mixed review, expressing dislike for the tracks "Four Letter Word" and "Lucky Guy" but again describing "Hey Mister Heartache" as "brilliant" and "Love in the Natural Way" as "steamy". Caroline Sullivan of Melody Maker gave a mostly positive review but noted the similarities of the production to recent work by SAW and wrote "Many songs here could be Bananarama Wow! tracks with Kim's voice superimposed." Q, while describing Wilde as an institution in British pop (along with Bananarama), wrote that "You Came" sounded "dated" and "like an out-take from Human League's Dare". However, praise was reserved for a "really special moment"; Wilde's faithful version of Todd Rundgren's "Lucky Guy". "Writing for Sounds, Peter Kane compared the "pure pop" album unfavorably to the work of Pet Shop Boys and Belinda Carlisle, specifically citing "Four Letter Word" as "having been discarded by Sheena Easton while clearing her wardrobe of Crimplene jumpsuits."

Track listing
Side One
"Hey Mister Heartache" (Kim Wilde, Steve Byrd) - 4:34
"You Came" (Kim Wilde, Ricky Wilde) - 4:33
"Four Letter Word" (Marty Wilde, Ricky Wilde) - 4:02
"Love in the Natural Way" (Kim Wilde, Marty Wilde, Ricky Wilde) - 4:07
"Love's a No" (Kim Wilde, Marty Wilde, Ricky Wilde) - 4:16
Side Two
"Never Trust a Stranger" (Kim Wilde, Ricky Wilde) - 4:04
"You'll Be the One Who'll Lose" (Kim Wilde, Marty Wilde, Ricky Wilde) - 4:32
"European Soul" (Kim Wilde, Ricky Wilde) - 5:20
"Stone" (Kim Wilde, Marty Wilde, Ricky Wilde) - 4:41
"Lucky Guy" (Todd Rundgren) - 2:38

 Bonus track on cd: "Hey Mister Heartache" (12" version) - 8:06

25th Anniversary Edition

Previously unreleased

Personnel 
 Kim Wilde – lead and backing vocals 
 Ricky Wilde – keyboards, programming, guitars, backing vocals 
 Tony Swain – keyboards, programming 
 Bias Boshell – additional keyboards (10)
 Steve Byrd – guitars 
 Junior Giscombe – backing vocals, additional vocals (1)
 Nicci Sun – backing vocals

Production 
 Ricky Wilde – producer 
 Tony Swain – producer (1-5, 7-10)
 James Richards – engineer 
 Richard Lengyel – mixing 
 Michael Nash – album design 
 Russell Young – photography

Charts

Weekly charts

Year-end charts

Certifications and sales

References

Wilde Life: the official Kim Wilde fansite Discography – Close

1988 albums
Kim Wilde albums
MCA Records albums